Tse Uk Village is a village in the Sha Tin Wai area of Sha Tin District, Hong Kong.

Administration
Tse Uk is a recognized village under the New Territories Small House Policy.

References

External links

 Delineation of area of existing village Fui Yiu Ha and Tse Uk (Sha Tin) for election of resident representative (2019 to 2022)

Villages in Sha Tin District, Hong Kong
Sha Tin Wai